Carl Dragstedt (1895–1983) is a scientist who discovered the role of Histamine in Anaphylaxis.

He was a chairman of the Northwestern University's pharmacology department, a Northwestern professor for 38 years and a retired physician with a practice in Edison Park.

References 

1895 births
1983 deaths
American pharmacologists
Northwestern University faculty